Billboard Top R&B Records of 1955 is made up of three year-end charts compiled by Billboard magazine ranking the year's top rhythm and blues records based on record sales, disc jockey plays, and juke box plays.

See also
List of Billboard number-one R&B songs of 1955
Billboard year-end top 30 singles of 1955
1955 in music

References

1955 record charts
Billboard charts
1955 in American music